The 2020 Patriot League men's soccer season is the 31st season of men's varsity soccer in the conference. The season was slated to begin on August 29, 2020 and conclude on November 14, 2020. Due to the ongoing COVID-19 pandemic, the season was postponed to begin on February 3, 2021, and conclude on April 17, 2021.

Despite the delay, Army and Navy will be playing competitive fixtures during the fall season.

Fall 2020 season

Fall matches 
The two service academies in the conference, Army and Navy, played competitive matches during the fall.

All times Eastern time.

Rankings

United Soccer Coaches 
During the fall 2020 season, United Soccer Coaches ran a Top 5 poll for the programs playing in fall.

TopDrawerSoccer.com 
During the fall 2020 season, United Soccer Coaches ran a Top 10 poll for the programs playing in fall.

Awards and honors

Spring 2021 season 
The Spring season will begin on February 27, 2021 and conclude on April 10, 2021. Teams will be divided into the North and South Division for the season to minimize travel due to the pandemic.

Preseason poll 
The preseason poll will be released in December 2020 or January 2021.

Preseason national polls 
The preseason national polls were originally to be released in July and August 2020. Only CollegeSoccerNews.com released a preseason poll for 2020.

Early season tournaments 

Early season tournaments will be announced in late Fall 2020 and winter 2021.

Results 

All times Eastern time.† denotes Homecoming game

Rankings

National rankings

Regional rankings - South Region 

The United Soccer Coaches' south region ranks teams among the ACC, Atlantic Sun, and SoCon.

Players of the Week

MLS SuperDraft 

The MLS SuperDraft was held on January 21, 2021 and was held virtually through its website. No players from the Patriot League were selected in the draft.

References 

 
2020 NCAA Division I men's soccer season
Association football events postponed due to the COVID-19 pandemic